Embryoglossa bipuncta is a species of snout moth in the genus Embryoglossa. It was described by George Hampson in 1903 and is known from India.

References

Moths described in 1903
Pyralinae